The Vietnamese ambassador in Beijing is the official representative of the Government in Hanoi to the Government of the People's Republic of China.

List of ambassadors

See also
China–Vietnam relations

References

 
China
Vietnam